Baeriidae is a family of calcareous sponges in the class Calcarea. It was named by Borojevic, Boury-Esnault, and Vacelet in 2000. The type genus is Baeria Miklucho-Maclay, 1870, by original designation, though Baeria is now considered a junior synonym of Leuconia Grant, 1833.

Genera
The following genera are in the family Baeriidae:
Eilhardia Poléjaeff, 1883
Lamontia Kirk, 1895
Leuconia Grant, 1833
Leucopsila Dendy & Row, 1913

References

Calcaronea
Sponge families
Taxa named by Nicole Boury-Esnault
Taxa named by Jean Vacelet